Battle Magic, a fantasy novel by young adult author Tamora Pierce, was released by Scholastic on September 24, 2013.

The book follows Pierce's characters Briar Moss, Evumeimei Dingzai (nicknamed Evvy), and Rosethorn after the events of her 2001 novel Street Magic. The action is set in the fictional countries of Gyongxe and Yanjing as they become embroiled in war. All events take place two years before Pierce's previously published Emelan universe novels The Will of the Empress and Melting Stones.

Plot introduction
Mages Briar, Rosethorn, and Evvy are visiting the mystical mountain kingdom of Gyongxe when they are suddenly called away. The emperor of Yanjing has invited them to see his glorious gardens.

During their brief stay, though, the mages see far more than splendid flowers. They see the emperor's massive army, his intense cruelty, and the devastating magic that keeps his power in place.

It's not till they leave that they discover he's about to launch a major invasion of Gyongxe. The mountain land is home to many temples... including the First Temple of the Living Circle, which Rosethorn has vowed to defend.

With time running out, the mages race to warn their Gyongxin friends of the emperor's plans.

Duty, mystery, magic, and terror will drive them apart on the way. And while new friends will do their best to bring the mages together again on the field of battle, deadly enemies hide in every mountain pass, just waiting to destroy them.

References

External links
Tamora Pierce's official website

Emelanese books
2013 American novels
2013 fantasy novels